Bogumił Kazimierz Brzezinski (born 22 May 1943) is a Polish chemist, Professor of chemistry science who specialises in the field of infrared spectroscopy, hydrogen bonds. Co-worker of Prof. Georg Zundel. He is co-author of nearly 400 original scientific publications.

Career 
In 1967 he graduated from the Faculty of Mathematics, Physics and Chemistry at the Adam Mickiewicz University in Poznań with M.Sc. degree. Brzezinski defended his Ph.D. in 1972 and D.Sc. in 1982. He is a Professor since 1991. 
He was Vice-Dean of the Faculty of Chemistry UAM in the years 1990–1996. Currently Prof. Brzezinski is the head of the Department of Biochemistry since 1998.
In the years 1975–1977 Brzezinski was Alexander von Humboldt Fellow at the Faculty of Biophysic of University of Munich in Germany. Many times he was visiting Professor of Humboldt University (Faculty of Biophysic Charite) in Berlin.

Research areas 
 Biochemistry, bioorganic and organic chemistry.
 Ionophores (monensin, lasalocid), their structures, antibacterial activity and chemical modifications.
 Ion channels, proton pumping - chemical modification, mechanism and biological activity, collective hydrogen bonds and bonds with monovalent metal cations.
 Gossypol and its derivatives - syntheses, spectroscopic investigations and biological tests.
 New compounds important in agriculture and medicine.
 Acid–base reactions - the role of arginine in biological systems.
 Chemistry of proton sponges.

References

External links
 Bogumił Brzezinski in Polish Science service
 Bogumił Brzezinski at the Adam Mickiewicz University website

1941 births
Polish physical chemists
Adam Mickiewicz University in Poznań alumni
Academic staff of Adam Mickiewicz University in Poznań
Academic staff of the Humboldt University of Berlin
Living people